Patrick Pope may refer to;

 Patrick H. Pope (1806–1841), U.S. Representative from Kentucky
 Pat Pope (born 1966), British photographer